Stephan Lars Andreas Brunner Neibig (born 28 February 1961) is a Costa Rican politician and economist who is the First Vice-president of Costa Rica. He assumed office on 8 May 2022.

Brunner earned a Bachelor of Arts degree in cultural economics from the University of Kiel, a Master of Arts in economics from Indiana University Bloomington, and a PhD in economics from the University of Kiel.

References

Living people
1961 births
Costa Rican politicians
University of Kiel alumni
Indiana University Bloomington alumni